The Head of the Altai Republic is the head of the republic and government of Altai Republic, the federal subject of Russia. The head of the Republic is elected by the citizens of Altai Republic for five years.

Powers
The powers of The head of the Republic are regulated by chapters 10 and 11 of the Constitution of the Altai Republic.

Represents the Republic of Altai Republic in relations with Federal bodies of state power, bodies of state power of subjects of the Russian Federation, bodies of local self-government and the implementation of foreign economic relations, the right to sign contracts and agreements on behalf of the Republic of Altai;
promulgates the laws of the Altai Republic, certifying their publication by signing, or rejects the laws adopted by the State Assembly — El Kurultai of the Altai Republic;
forms the Government of Altai Republic in accordance with the legislation of Altai Republic;
defines the structure of the Executive bodies of state power of the Altai Republic;
with the consent Of the State Assembly — El Kurultai of the Altai Republic appoints members of the government of the Altai Republic, the list of which is determined by the Constitution;
it has the right to demand the convening of an extraordinary session of the State Assembly — El Kurultai of the Altai Republic, as well as to convene a newly elected state Assembly-El Kurultai of the Altai Republic for the first session before the deadline established by the Constitution;
has the right to participate in the work of the State Assembly — El Kurultai of the Altai Republic with the right of consultative vote;
has the right of legislative initiative in the State Assembly — El Kurultai of the Altai Republic;
annually submits to the State Assembly — El Kurultai of the Altai Republic the draft budget of the Altai Republic and the report on its execution;
submits to the State Assembly — El Kurultai of the Altai Republic projects of socio - economic development programs of the Altai Republic and reports on their implementation;
has the right to make the decision on early termination of powers of the State Assembly — El Kurultay of Altai Republic on the bases and in the order provided by the legislation;
appoints and recalls representatives of the Altai Republic in the bodies of state power of the Russian Federation and its subjects;
appoint a Senator — representative from the Government of the Altai Republic;
appoints half the members of the Election Commission of the Altai Republic;
award state decorations of the Republic of Altai Republic and confer honorary titles of the Republic of Altai in accordance with the legislation;
appeals to the Constitutional Court of Russia;
submits to the State Assembly — El Kurultai of the Altai Republic annual reports on the situation in the Republic;
it has the right to decide on the resignation of the government of the Republic, some of its members, as well as voluntary resignation of members of the Government;
forms a unified apparatus of the head and the government of the Altai Republic;
provides coordination of activity of Executive authorities of the Republic of Altai with other public authorities of the Republic of Altai and according to the legislation of the Russian Federation can organize interaction of Executive authorities of the Republic of Altai with Federal Executive authorities and their territorial authorities, local governments and public associations;
exercises other powers in accordance with Federal laws, this Constitution and the laws of the Altai Republic.

List

References

00000000000000000000000000Russian Administrative divisions

 
Politics of the Altai Republic
Altai Republic